Desulfovibrio paquesii is a bacterium. It is sulfate-reducing and hydrogenotrophic. The type strain is SB1(T) (=DSM 16681(T)=JCM 14635(T)).

References

Further reading
Staley, James T., et al. "Bergey's manual of systematic bacteriology, vol. 3."Williams and Wilkins, Baltimore, MD (1989): 2250–2251.
Bélaich, Jean-Pierre, Mireille Bruschi, and Jean-Louis Garcia, eds. Microbiology and biochemistry of strict Anaerobes Involved in interspecies hydrogen transfer. No. 54. Springer, 1990.

External links
LPSN

Type strain of Desulfovibrio paquesii at BacDive -  the Bacterial Diversity Metadatabase

Bacteria described in 2009
Desulfovibrio